The 2018–19 Slovenian Football Cup was the 28th edition of the football knockout competition in Slovenia. The winners of the cup earned a place in the 2019–20 UEFA Europa League first qualifying round. The tournament began on 14 August 2018 and ended on 30 May 2019 with the final.

Olimpija Ljubljana were the defending champions after defeating Aluminij with a score of 6–1 in the previous season's final. They successfully defended the title by defeating their eternal rivals Maribor 2–1 in the final.

Competition format

Qualified teams

2017–18 Slovenian PrvaLiga members
Aluminij
Ankaran
Celje
Domžale
Gorica
Krško
Maribor
Olimpija
Rudar Velenje
Triglav Kranj

Qualified through MNZ Regional Cups
2017–18 MNZ Celje Cup: Šampion and Rogaška
2017–18 MNZ Koper Cup: Koper and Plama Podgrad
2017–18 MNZG-Kranj Cup: Jesenice and Zarica Kranj
2017–18 MNZ Lendava Cup: Turnišče and Nafta
2017–18 MNZ Ljubljana Cup: Ivančna Gorica and Bravo
2017–18 MNZ Maribor Cup: Akumulator Mežica and Korotan Prevalje
2017–18 MNZ Murska Sobota Cup: Grad and Mura
2017–18 MNZ Nova Gorica Cup: Bilje and Brda
2017–18 MNZ Ptuj Cup: Videm and Drava Ptuj

Bracket

First round

Round of 16

Quarter-finals

First leg

Second leg

Semi-finals

First leg

Second leg

Final

See also
 2018–19 Slovenian PrvaLiga

References

External links
 UEFA

Slovenian Football Cup seasons
Cup
Slovenia